Tacanan is a family of languages spoken in Bolivia, with Ese’ejja also spoken in Peru. It may be related to the Panoan languages. Many of the languages are endangered.

Family division

Ese Ejja (a.k.a. Ese’eha, Tiatinagua, Chama, Huarayo, Guacanawa, Chuncho, Eseʼexa, Tatinawa, Ese exa)
Araona–Tacana
Araona (a.k.a. Carina, Cavina)
Cavineña–Tacana
Cavineña (a.k.a. Kavinenya)
Tacana
Tacana (a.k.a. Tupamasa, Takana)
Reyesano (a.k.a. San Borjano, Maropa)
Toromono †

Toromono is apparently extinct. Another possibly extinct Tacanan language is Mabenaro; Arasa has been classified as Tacanan, but appears to have more in common with Panoan.

Language contact
Jolkesky (2016) notes that there are lexical similarities with the Kayuvava, Tupi, and Arawak language families due to contact.

Varieties
Below is a full list of Tacanan language varieties listed by Loukotka (1968), including names of unattested varieties.

Tacana - language with many relationships with the Arawak and Pano languages, spoken on the Beni River, Tuichi River, and Tequeje River, territory of Colonia, Bolivia; now spoken by only a few families. Dialects are:
Tumupasa / Maracáni - spoken on the Uchipiamona River in the same region.
Isiama / Ydiama - spoken on the Unduma River and around Ydiama.

Araona - once spoken on the Madre de Dios River and Manuripi River in Colonia, Bolivia, now perhaps extinct.
Capechene / Capaheni - unknown language spoken on the Xapuri River and Rosiano River, Acre territory, Brazil. (Unattested.)
Sapiboca - extinct language once spoken at the old mission of Reyes, Beni province, Bolivia.
Chirigua / Shiribá - extinct language once spoken at the old mission of Santa Buenaventura, Beni. (Unattested.)
Guarizo - extinct language once spoken at the old missions of Reyes and San Antonio de Isiama.
Maropa - spoken in the vicinity of Lake Rogoaguado, Beni, now probably extinct.
Guacanahua / Chama / Ese'ejja - spoken by a small tribe on the Madidi River and Undumo River, La Paz province, Bolivia.
Mabenaro - spoken on the Manuripi River.
Caviña / Cavineña - once spoken on the Cavinas River, Madidi River, and Beni River, now probably extinct.
Toromona - once spoken between the Madidi River, Beni River, and Madre de Dios River, now perhaps extinct.
Arasa - language spoken by the greater part of the Arazaire tribe (of Pano stock) on the Marcopata River and Arasa River.
Tiatinagua / Mohino / Chuncho / Huarayo / Baguaja / Tambopata-Guarayo / Echoja - spoken by a tribe on the Peru-Bolivia border, on the Tambopata River.

Vocabulary
Loukotka (1968) lists the following basic vocabulary items for the Tacanan languages.

Sample vocabulary of four Tacanan languages, along with Proto-Panoan for comparison, from Nikulin (2019):

{| class="wikitable sortable"
! gloss !! Ese Ejja !! Araona !! Cavineña !! Tacana !! Proto-Panoan
|-
! liver
| e-kakʷa || tákʷa || e-takʷa || e-takʷa || *takʷa
|-
! tongue
| ej-ana || e-ána || j-ana || j-ana || *hana
|-
! blood
|  || ami || ami || ami || *himi
|-
! you (sg.)
| mi-a || mi || mi- || mi || *mi
|-
! hand
| e-me || e-me || e-me-tuku || e-me || *mɨ-
|-
! earth
| meʃi || mezizo || metʃi ‘soil’ || med’i || *mai
|-
! meat
| e-jami || e-ami || e-rami || j-ami ‘muscle’ || *rami
|-
! stone
|  || mahana || makana ||  || *maka
|-
! bone
| e-sá || e-tsoa || e-tsau || e-tsau || *ʂao
|-
! (finger)nail
| e-me-kiʃe || Ø-mé-tezi ||  || e-me-tid’i || *mɨ̃-tsis
|-
! fat
| e-sei || e-tsei || e-tseri || e-tsei || *ʂɨ[n]i
|-
! tooth
| e-sé || e-tse || e-tse || e-tse || *ʂɨta
|}

Further reading
Girard, Victor (1971). Proto-Takanan Phonology (University of California Publications in Linguistics, 70.) Berkeley/Los Angeles: University of California Press.

Notes

References
 Adelaar, Willem F. H.; & Muysken, Pieter C. (2004). The languages of the Andes. Cambridge language surveys. Cambridge University Press.
 Campbell, Lyle. (1997). American Indian languages: The historical linguistics of Native America. New York: Oxford University Press. .
 Kaufman, Terrence. (1990). Language history in South America: What we know and how to know more. In D. L. Payne (Ed.), Amazonian linguistics: Studies in lowland South American languages (pp. 13–67). Austin: University of Texas Press. .
 Kaufman, Terrence. (1994). The native languages of South America. In C. Mosley & R. E. Asher (Eds.), Atlas of the world's languages (pp. 46–76). London: Routledge.

External links
 Proel: Familia Tacanana
 Tacana language dictionary online from IDS (select simple or advanced browsing)

 
Pano-Tacanan languages
Indigenous languages of South America (Central)
Indigenous languages of Western Amazonia
Languages of Bolivia
Languages of Brazil
Languages of Peru